Lost on the Way is an album by French clarinetist and composer Louis Sclavis recorded in 2008 and released on the ECM label.

Reception
The Allmusic review by Michael G. Nastos awarded the album 4½ stars stating "This is masterpiece among many well-crafted efforts by Sclavis, and comes highly recommended for fans of or newcomers to his extraordinary music".

Track listing
All compositions by Louis Sclavis except as indicated
 "De Charybde en Scylla" – 5:35 
 "La Première Île"  (Olivier Lété, Sclavis) – 1:24 
 "Lost on the Way" (Lété, Sclavis) – 6:42 
 "Bain d'Or" – 6:03 
 "Le Sommeil des Sirènes" – 7:23 
 "L 'Heure des Songes" – 4:19 
 "Aboard Ulysses's Boat" – 5:52 
 "Les Doutes du Cyclope" – 6:51 
 "Un Vent Noir" – 3:40 
 "The Last Island" (Lété) – 1:20 
 "Des Bruits à Tisser" – 5:18 
 "L 'Absence" – 2:24 
Recorded at the Théâtre de Saint-Quentin-en-Yvelines, France in September 2008.

Personnel
Louis Sclavis — clarinet, soprano saxophone
Matthias Metzger — soprano saxophone, alto saxophone
Maxime Delpierre — guitar
Olivier Lété — bass
François Merville — drums

References

ECM Records albums
Louis Sclavis albums
2009 albums
Albums produced by Manfred Eicher